Pseudopostega tucumanae is a moth of the family Opostegidae. It is only known from the province of Tucuman, in northern Argentina at an elevation of 800 meters.

The length of the forewings is 3.1–4 mm. Adults are mostly white. Adults have been collected in December and February.

Etymology
The specific epithet is derived from Tucuman, the province in Argentina from whence the type series was collected.

External links
A Revision of the New World Plant-Mining Moths of the Family Opostegidae (Lepidoptera: Nepticuloidea)

Opostegidae
Moths described in 2007